Nemanja Čović (Serbian Cyrillic: Немања Човић; born 18 June 1991) is a Serbian football forward who plays for Kunshan.

Club career

Early years
Čović came through the Vojvodina youth categories, and began his professional career at the age of 16 at Cement Beočin, making 19 league appearances and scoring 5 goals. He said: "The goal was to continue the tradition, since all the men from my closest family started their careers in Cement. It is interesting that all of them were defenders, I am the only forward".

Vojvodina
During the summer of 2011, Čović was signed to Vojvodina by a free transfer. He scored against Vaduz in a game that Vojvodina lost 3–1 in the 2011–12 UEFA Europa League qualifying phase.
Subsequently, having spent only a month with Vojvodina, Čović was traded to Spartak Zlatibor Voda. He made his league debut for his new club on 10 September 2011 in a 2-0 away victory over Novi Pazar.

International career

Youth level
Čović appeared for under-19 and scored a goal in three games. On 29 February 2012, Čović scored a goal in a friendly for Serbia's U21 team against Bosnia and Herzegovina U21.

Senior national team
Čović got his first call up to the senior Serbia side for the friendly games against Dominican Republic and Panama. He made his debut on 25 January 2021, as a substitution during halftime. In the second half of a draw game against Panama he took captain’s armband.

Career statistics

International

Honours

Club
Proleter Novi Sad
 Serbian First League: 2017–18
 Serbian League Vojvodina: 2008–09

Shakhtyor Soligorsk
 Belarusian Cup runner-up: 2014–15
 Belarusian Super Cup runner-up: 2015

Vojvodina
 Serbian Cup: 2019–20

Kunshan
 China League One: 2022

Individual
 Province of Vojvodina Men's Player of the Year Award: 2018
 Vojvodina Player of the Season: 2020–21

References

External links
 Nemanja Čović at uefa.com

Nemanja Čović at Footballdatabase

1991 births
Living people
Footballers from Novi Sad
Serbian footballers
Serbia under-21 international footballers
Serbia youth international footballers
Association football forwards
Serbian SuperLiga players
Serbian First League players
Kazakhstan Premier League players
Belarusian Premier League players
Super League Greece 2 players
Serbian expatriate footballers
Serbian expatriate sportspeople in Italy
Serbian expatriate sportspeople in Kazakhstan
Serbian expatriate sportspeople in Belarus
Serbian expatriate sportspeople in Greece
Expatriate footballers in Italy
Expatriate footballers in Kazakhstan
Expatriate footballers in Belarus
FK Proleter Novi Sad players
FK Cement Beočin players
Parma Calcio 1913 players
FK Vojvodina players
FK Spartak Subotica players
FK Donji Srem players
FC Spartak Semey players
FC Shakhtyor Soligorsk players
FC Minsk players
PAS Lamia 1964 players
Serbia international footballers
Kunshan F.C. players
Expatriate footballers in China